"p:Machinery" is a song by German new wave/synth-pop band Propaganda, released as the third single from their debut album A Secret Wish. The song reached the top 10 in various countries across Europe, including France and Italy, but was most successful in Spain, where it peaked at number one. In the US, the song reached the top 10 on the dance chart. The top line for the track was written by David Sylvian, who was approached to produce for the band but ultimately did not.

Background
David Sylvian's contribution as given by Sylvian himself:

"I contributed the keyboard melody and response at the beginning of the 'p-machine' I think the piece was called, plus a few other minor ideas here and there. I can't be more precise as my memory of the sessions aren't clear plus the pieces were recorded over more then  once I believe so although the ideas remain my performance of them may not. I did restructure a piece for them arrangement wise…can't think of the title, don't have a copy of the album. It did finally give them a hit single I believe but I wouldn't swear to it."

Formats and track listing
7" single
A. "p:Machinery" – 3:49
B. "Frozen Faces" – 4:22

12" single
A. "p:Machinery (extended version)" – 9:20
B1. "p:Machinery" – 3:49
B2. "Frozen Faces (12" version)" – 5:30

Chart performance

Weekly charts

Year-end charts

See also
List of number-one singles of 1986 (Spain)

References

1985 songs
1985 singles
Propaganda (band) songs
Number-one singles in Spain
Song recordings produced by Stephen Lipson
ZTT Records singles
Island Records singles